Kamenica is a village in the administrative area of city of Kragujevac, Serbia (Stragari municipality). According to the 2011 census, the village has a population of 329 people.

References

Populated places in Šumadija District